Resource Reservation Protocol - Traffic Engineering (RSVP-TE) is an extension of the Resource Reservation Protocol (RSVP) for traffic engineering. It supports the reservation of resources across an IP network. Applications running on IP end systems can use RSVP to indicate to other nodes the nature (bandwidth, jitter, maximum burst, and so forth) of the packet streams they want to receive. RSVP runs on both IPv4 and IPv6.

RSVP-TE generally allows the establishment of Multiprotocol Label Switching (MPLS) label-switched paths (LSPs), taking into consideration network constraint parameters such as available bandwidth and explicit hops.

History
, the Internet Engineering Task Force (IETF) MPLS working group deprecated Constraint-based Routing Label Distribution Protocol (CR-LDP) and decided to focus purely on RSVP-TE. Operational overhead of RSVP-TE compared to the more widely deployed Label Distribution Protocol (LDP) will generally be higher. This is a classic trade-off between complexity and optimality in the use of technologies in telecommunications networks.

Standards
  - RSVP-TE: Extensions to RSVP for LSP Tunnels
  - The Multiprotocol Label Switching (MPLS) Working Group decision on MPLS signaling protocols
  - Fast Reroute Extensions to RSVP-TE for LSP Tunnels
  - Exclude Routes - Extension to Resource ReserVation Protocol-Traffic Engineering (RSVP-TE)
  - Crankback Signaling Extensions for MPLS and GMPLS RSVP-TE
  - Inter-Domain MPLS and GMPLS Traffic Engineering—Resource Reservation Protocol-Traffic Engineering (RSVP-TE) Extensions
  - Encoding of Attributes for Multiprotocol Label Switching (MPLS) Label Switched Path (LSP) Establishment Using Resource ReserVation Protocol-Traffic Engineering (RSVP-TE)
  - Node Behavior upon Originating and Receiving Resource Reservation Protocol (RSVP) Path Error Messages 
  - Generalized MPLS (GMPLS) Protocol Extensions for Multi-Layer and Multi-Region Networks (MLN/MRN)

References

Further reading
 

Internet architecture